Mosharraf Hossain Shahjahan (19 September 1939 – 5 May 2012) was a Bangladesh Nationalist Party politician and the former Member of Parliament from Bhola-1. He was elected to parliament 6 times from Bhola. He was a former State Minister of Religious Affairs.

Birth and early life 
Shahjahan was born on 19 September 1939 in Bhola District.

Career
Shahjahan joined Bangladesh Nationalist Party soon after Ziaur Rahman founded the party. He became the organizing secretary of Khulna District unit of the party. In 1991 he was made the State Minister for water resources in the first cabinet of Prime Minister Khaleda Zia and in 2001 he was appointed State Minister of Religious Affairs in the second cabinet of Khaleda Zia.

Death
Shahjahan died on 5 May 2012 in United Hospital, Dhaka, Bangladesh.

References

1939 births
2012 deaths
Bangladesh Nationalist Party politicians
3rd Jatiya Sangsad members
5th Jatiya Sangsad members
6th Jatiya Sangsad members
8th Jatiya Sangsad members
State Ministers of Religious Affairs (Bangladesh)
State Ministers of Water Resources (Bangladesh)